was a Japanese screenwriter most famous for collaborating with Yasujirō Ozu on many of the director's films.

Born in Hakodate, Noda was the son of the head of the local tax bureau and younger brother to Kyūho, a Nihonga painter. He moved to Nagoya after completing elementary school and later went to Waseda University. After graduating, he worked for the city of Tokyo while also serving as a reporter for Katsudō kurabu, one of the major film magazines, using the pen name Harunosuke Midorikawa. On the recommendation of a scriptwriter friend from junior high, Takashi Oda, he joined the script department at Shōchiku after the Great Kantō earthquake. He soon became one of the studio's central screenwriters, penning for instance Aizen katsura (1938), one of its biggest prewar hits.

He is most known for his collaborations with Ozu, which began with Noda supplying the script for the director's first feature Sword of Penitence (1927) and led to such postwar works as Tokyo Story (1953), regarded by many critics as one of the greatest films of all time. He co-wrote thirteen of Ozu's fifteen postwar films.

When the Writers Association of Japan was formed in 1950, Noda served as its first chair.

Selected filmography

References

External links
 Noda Kōgo's grave, Rekishi ga nemuru Tama Reien 
 
 

1893 births
1968 deaths
People from Hakodate
Waseda University alumni
20th-century Japanese screenwriters